The second series of Sky One comedy-drama television series Brassic began broadcasting on 7 May 2020. Joe Gilgun, Michelle Keegan, Damien Molony, Tom Hanson, Aaron Heffernan, Ryan Sampson and Parth Thakerar reprised their roles from the first series, whereas Claude Scott-Mitchell joined the cast. The second series consisted of six episodes, which were broadcast on a weekly schedule, though all episodes were prematurely released entirely on the premiere date through the Sky television streaming service. The series concluded on 11 June 2020.

Brassic follows the lives of Vinnie (Gilgun) and his five friends who live in the fictional northern English town of Hawley. The working class group commit various crimes in order to survive, but as they get older, some of them begin to wonder whether they wouldn't be better off away from town. The second series follows up from the previous series, in which Vinnie faked his own death in order to avoid torture from "businessman" Terence McCann (Ramon Tikaram).

Cast
 Joe Gilgun as Vinnie O'Neill
 Michelle Keegan as Erin Croft
 Damien Molony as Dylan
 Tom Hanson as Cardi
 Aaron Heffernan as Ash Dennings
 Ryan Sampson as Tommo
 Parth Thakerar as JJ
 Steve Evets as Jim
 Claude Scott-Mitchell as Sara
 Dominic West as Dr. Chris Cox
 Bronagh Gallagher as Carol
 Joanna Higson as Sugar

Episodes

Marketing
On 24 April 2020, Sky One released the second series' trailer, briefly showing the events that would occur and announcing its release date of 7 May.

Release

Broadcast
The series began broadcasting on 7 May 2020. Due to the COVID-19 pandemic, the United Kingdom entered into an emergency lock-down; many journalists then urged people to watch the programme, referring to it as "an essential lockdown binge-watch".

Critical response
Critics that are registered to review aggregator website Rotten Tomatoes have praised the second series, in particular for its humour and for bringing happiness in a negative time during the COVID-19 pandemic.

References

External links
 

2020 British television seasons